Agonopterix mendesi is a moth of the family Depressariidae which is endemic to Portugal.

The larvae feed on Centaurea sphaerocephala.

References

Moths described in 2002
Endemic arthropods of Portugal
Moths of Europe
Agonopterix